Caio César da Silva Silveira commonly known as Caio César (born 27 July 1995), is a Brazilian professional footballer who plays as an attacking midfielder or left winger for Japanese club V-Varen Nagasaki.

Career statistics
Updated to October 15th, 2022.

References

External links

Caio César at Footballdatabase

1995 births
Living people
Brazilian footballers
Association football midfielders
Campeonato Brasileiro Série A players
Campeonato Brasileiro Série B players
Campeonato Brasileiro Série C players
Vila Nova Futebol Clube players
Avaí FC players
Tombense Futebol Clube players
Kawasaki Frontale players
V-Varen Nagasaki players
J1 League players
J2 League players
Brazilian expatriate footballers
Brazilian expatriate sportspeople in Bulgaria
Expatriate footballers in Japan
People from São Vicente, São Paulo
Footballers from São Paulo (state)